Paul T. Fuhrman (May 10, 1883 – June 4, 1965) was an American farmer, businessman, and politician.

Born in the town of Fairbanks, Shawano County, Wisconsin, Fuhrman was a building contractor, in the lumber and retail hardware business, and farming. Fuhrman served as town chairman of Bartelme, Wisconsin 1912–1922, village president of Bowler, Wisconsin 1924-1932 and also served on the Shawano County Board of Supervisors. From 1927 until 1939, Fuhrman served in the Wisconsin State Assembly and was a Progressive. Fuhrman died in Tigerton, Wisconsin,

Notes

1883 births
1965 deaths
People from Shawano County, Wisconsin
Businesspeople from Wisconsin
Farmers from Wisconsin
Wisconsin Progressives (1924)
Mayors of places in Wisconsin
County supervisors in Wisconsin
Members of the Wisconsin State Assembly
20th-century American politicians
20th-century American businesspeople